Kerry North was a parliamentary constituency represented in Dáil Éireann, the house of representatives of the Oireachtas (the Irish parliament), from 1937 to 2011, and as Kerry North–West Limerick from 2011 to 2016. The method of election was proportional representation by means of the single transferable vote (PR-STV).

History and boundaries 
The constituency was located in the northern half of County Kerry, located between the River Shannon estuary and the Slieve Mish Mountains; and included Tralee, Listowel, Tarbert, Ballybunion and Castleisland. It was established by the Electoral (Revision of Constituencies) Act 1935 when the former Kerry constituency was divided into Kerry North and Kerry South. It was first used at the 1937 general election to the 9th Dáil.

The constituency elected 4 deputies (Teachtaí Dála, commonly known as TDs) from 1937 to 1961 and 3 deputies from 1961 to 2011.

When it was renamed in 2011, it had been defined as:

In 2007, the Constituency Commission proposed that at the next general election the constituency of Kerry North be renamed as Kerry North–West Limerick, with the transfer of certain electoral divisions from Limerick West and other electoral divisions to Kerry South. It was established by the Electoral (Amendment) Act 2009, and was used at the 2011 general election.

The constituency of Kerry North–West Limerick comprised the northern half of County Kerry, located between the River Shannon estuary and the Slieve Mish Mountains; taking in Tralee, Listowel, Tarbert, Ballybunion and Castleisland; and the western part of County Limerick taking in the town of Abbeyfeale; and the villages of Athea, Glin, Mountcollins, Templeglantine and Tournafulla. It was only used at the 2011 general election and was defined as:

At the 2016 general election, it was superseded by the constituencies of Kerry and Limerick County.

TDs

Elections

2011 general election

2007 general election

2002 general election

1997 general election

1992 general election

1989 general election

1987 general election

November 1982 general election

February 1982 general election

1981 general election

1977 general election

1973 general election

1969 general election

1965 general election

1961 general election

1957 general election

1956 by-election 
Following the death of Clann na Poblachta TD Johnny Connor, a by-election was held on 29 February 1956. The seat was won by the Clann na Poblachta candidate Kathleen O'Connor, daughter of the deceased TD.

1954 general election

1951 general election

1948 general election

1944 general election

1943 general election

1938 general election

1937 general election

See also 
Dáil constituencies
Politics of the Republic of Ireland
List of political parties in the Republic of Ireland
List of Dáil by-elections
Elections in the Republic of Ireland

References

External links 
Oireachtas Members Database

Politics of County Kerry
Historic constituencies in County Kerry
Historic constituencies in County Limerick
Dáil constituencies in the Republic of Ireland (historic)
1937 establishments in Ireland
2011 disestablishments in Ireland
Constituencies established in 1937
Constituencies disestablished in 2011
2011 establishments in Ireland
Constituencies established in 2011
2016 disestablishments in Ireland
Constituencies disestablished in 2016